Gerolamo Ubertino Provana, C.R. (1658–1696) was a Roman Catholic prelate who served as Bishop of Alba (1692–1696).

Biography
Gerolamo Ubertino Provana was born in Nizza Monferrato, Italy in 1658 and ordained a priest in the Congregation of Clerics Regular of the Divine Providence in 1674.
On 25 June 1692, he was appointed during the papacy of Pope Innocent XII as Bishop of Alba.
On 30 June 1692, he was consecrated bishop by Fabrizio Spada, Cardinal-Priest of San Crisogono with Michelangelo Mattei, Titular Archbishop of Hadrianopolis in Haemimonto, and Baldassare Cenci (seniore), Titular Archbishop of Larissa in Thessalia, serving as co-consecrators. 
He served as Bishop of Alba  until his death on 16 August 1696.

References

External links and additional sources
 (for Chronology of Bishops) 
 (for Chronology of Bishops) 

17th-century Italian Roman Catholic bishops
Bishops appointed by Pope Innocent XII
1658 births
1696 deaths
People from Nizza Monferrato
Theatine bishops